Lancini is an Italian surname. Notable people with it include:

Danilo Oscar Lancini (born 1965), Italian politician
Edoardo Lancini (born 1994), Italian footballer
Lynette Lancini (born 1970), Australian classical composer
Nicola Lancini (born 1994), Italian footballer

See also
Lancini's robber frog, a species of frog in the family Craugastoridae

Italian-language surnames